The 2009 Brownlow Medal was the 82nd year the award was presented to the player adjudged the fairest and best player during the Australian Football League (AFL) home and away season. Gary Ablett of the Geelong Football Club won the medal by polling thirty votes during the 2009 AFL season.

Ablett won the award with thirty votes, eight votes ahead of 2004 medal winner, Chris Judd. It was Ablett's first Brownlow, despite winning many other awards in the previous few years and being the Brownlow pre-count favourite for the previous three years. It was the second time in three years that a player from Geelong won the Brownlow Medal.

Leading vote-getters

Ablett's victory 
Gary Ablett's victory in the 2009 medal followed his sixth-place finish in 2007 and his third-place finish in 2008. In all three years he was the favourite to win the award. Ablett polled in 13 matches, including eight best-on-ground performances. His seventh consecutive best-on-ground performance in round 20 confirmed his victory, as his 26-vote tally at this point was seven votes ahead of Judd, Brown and Hayes, who were all equal on 19 votes with only six votes left from the remaining two rounds. During his acceptance speech, Ablett referred to his father, Australian Football Hall of Fame member Gary Ablett Sr., who, despite being considered one of the best footballers players of all time, never won a Brownlow medal.

Voting procedure 
The three field umpires (those umpires who control the flow of the game, as opposed to goal or boundary umpires) confer after each match and award three votes, two votes, and one vote to the players they regard as the best, second-best and third-best in the match, respectively. The votes are kept secret until the awards night, and they are read and tallied on the evening.

Ineligible players 
As the medal is awarded to the fairest and best player in the league, those who have been suspended during the season by the AFL Tribunal (or, who avoided suspension only because of a discount for a good record or an early guilty plea) are ineligible to win the award; however, they may still continue to poll votes. Sam Mitchell was the leading ineligible player after being found guilty of striking Adelaide's David Mackay. Chris Judd was suspended for an incident during the finals, but under the rules he remained eligible for both this year's and the 2010 medal, the latter of which he won.

 Jack Anthony
 Jason Akermanis
 Chance Bateman
 Jared Brennan
 Dean Brogan
 Domenic Cassisi
 Joel Corey
 Trent Cotchin
 Lance Franklin
 Michael Gardiner
 Barry Hall
 Daniel Kerr
 Justin Koschitzke
 Cameron Ling
 Matthew Lloyd
 Nick Maxwell
 Adam McPhee
 Sam Mitchell
 Cameron Mooney
 Drew Petrie
 Jack Riewoldt
 Patrick Ryder
 Heath Shaw
 Kade Simpson
 Colin Sylvia
 Source:

Pre-count favourites 
Gary Ablett started the year as the favourite to win the medal with both the bookmakers and in a poll of all 16 AFL captains. He remained as favourite throughout the year and entered the count as the leading contender for the third consecutive year. Other leading contenders included Dane Swan and St Kilda midfielders Leigh Montagna, Nick Dal Santo and Lenny Hayes.

Brendan Fevola controversy 
Ablett's win was overshadowed by the behaviour of  full-forward Brendan Fevola. Fevola was heavily intoxicated at the function, and while on camera (or alleged to have been) verbally abused guests, gave his opinion on Brownlow votes, had a bottle of beer knocked out of his hands by 2008 Brownlow Medallist Adam Cooney, vomited and urinated on Casino fixtures, simulated sex acts, sexually harassed unsuspecting female guests and bystanders, sang a cappella on stage at the Brownlow after party, and fought with a Channel 7 journalist and Crown security staff before being removed from the complex by his teammates. Fevola was fined $10,000 by the AFL, fired from the Grand Final edition of the Footy Show, and withdrew himself from the Coleman Medallist's lap of honour at the 2009 AFL Grand Final.

Blue carpet arrivals 
For the first time, the carpet was blue, to celebrate the release of the new Toyota Prius. The carpet arrivals were hosted by Fifi Box and 's Brad Sewell.

References 

2009 in Australian rules football
2009 Australian Football League season
2009